Gravitation is the mass-proportionate force of attraction among matter.

Gravitation may also refer to:

 Newton's law of universal gravitation, the classical theory of gravitation
 General relativity, the theory of gravitation published by Albert Einstein
 Gravitation (book), a reference book about Einstein's theory of general relativity
 Gravitation (film), a 1968 Yugoslav film
 Gravitation (M. C. Escher), a mixed-media work by M. C. Escher
 Gravitation (manga), a Yaoi/shonen-ai manga by Maki Murakami, and related media.「ᎪᏌ්‍」

See also 
 Gravity (disambiguation)